Uschakoviella is a genus of amphipods in the family Epimeriidae. There is one described species in Uschakoviella, U. echinophora.

References

Amphipoda
Articles created by Qbugbot